is a professional wrestling tournament held annually by All Japan Pro Wrestling (AJPW) since 2013. The single-elimination tournament is a spiritual successor to the Open Championship tournament, which was held in 1975. Typically, the winner of the tournament earns a future match for the Triple Crown Heavyweight Championship.

History
On July 30, 2013, All Japan Pro Wrestling (AJPW) announced a new single-elimination tournament, set to take place the following September. Masanobu Fuchi, advisor to the AJPW board of directors, announced that the tournament was open to both Japanese and foreign wrestlers regardless of their weight divisions. This sets it apart from AJPW's top tournament, the Champion Carnival, which is generally exclusive to heavyweight wrestlers. Since its inception, the tournament has been subtitled "Open Championship", which was a similar openweight tournament held by AJPW in 1975. In the spirit of keeping the new tournament different from the Champion Carnival, the elimination format was set for use (the 1975 tournament was round-robin, as opposed to the Carnival which at the time was by elimination). Fuchi hailed Ōdō Tournament as the start of AJPW's rebirth, coming in the heels of a mass exodus of wrestlers that led to the formation of the Wrestle-1 promotion. The winner of the tournament, if not already the reigning champion, will become the number one contender to the Triple Crown Heavyweight Championship.

List of winners
No tournament was held in 2020 due to the COVID-19 pandemic.

2013

The 2013 Ōdō Tournament took place between September 11 and 23 and featured sixteen wrestlers. The participants and brackets were revealed on August 11. Included were the reigning Triple Crown Heavyweight Champion Suwama and four outside wrestlers; Mexican AAA representative Dark Cuervo, American freelancers D'Lo Brown and Low Ki and Austrian freelancer Bambi Killer. As part of the openweight nature of the tournament, Atsushi Aoki, Kotaro Suzuki and World Junior Heavyweight Champion Yoshinobu Kanemaru from AJPW's junior heavyweight division also entered the tournament. The tournament marked the first tour under an AJPW contract for longtime freelancer Akebono, who signed his contract on September 1. On September 15, Suwama, the reigning Triple Crown Heavyweight Champion, was eliminated from the tournament in the second round by his former Last Revolution tag team partner Joe Doering. After being eliminated from the tournament on September 16 by Akebono, Low Ki was sidelined for the rest of his AJPW tour with an abdominal injury. The injury eventually led to Low Ki announcing his retirement from professional wrestling on October 14 due to AJPW supposedly not honoring their contractual obligation of medical care. He, however, returned to the ring the following summer. On September 23, Akebono defeated Go Shiozaki in the finals of the tournament to become the first Ōdō Tournament winner. Following the win, Akebono went on to defeat Suwama on October 27 to win the Triple Crown Heavyweight Championship for the first time.

2014
The 2014 Ōdō Tournament took place between September 15 and 28 and featured sixteen wrestlers. The participants and brackets were revealed on August 17. Included were the reigning Triple Crown Heavyweight Champion Joe Doering, the defending Ōdō Tournament winner Akebono and one qualifying match, set for August 30 between Sushi and Yohei Nakajima. Joe Doering, the reigning Triple Crown Heavyweight Champion, was eliminated from the tournament in his first round match on September 15 by Go Shiozaki, while veteran wrestler and AJPW's new president Jun Akiyama, for the second year in a row, was also eliminated in his first round match by Kento Miyahara. Akebono, the defending Ōdō Tournament winner, was eliminated from the tournament in the semifinals on September 22 by Suwama. On September 28, Shiozaki defeated Suwama in the finals to win the second Ōdō Tournament. Shiozaki received his shot at the Triple Crown Heavyweight Championship on October 29, but was defeated by Doering.

2015

The 2015 Ōdō Tournament took place between September 10 and 26 and featured sixteen wrestlers. The participants were revealed on August 24. Included were the reigning Triple Crown Heavyweight Champion and 2013 Ōdō Tournament winner Akebono, reigning World Tag Team Champion and 2014 Ōdō Tournament winner Go Shiozaki, his championship partner Kento Miyahara and debuting outsiders Shuji Ishikawa and Yuji Hino. Tournament brackets were revealed on August 29. Jun Akiyama, the president of AJPW, won the tournament, defeating Akebono in the finals on September 26.

2016

The 2016 Ōdō Tournament took place between September 4 and 19. The participants were revealed on August 6. Included were the reigning Triple Crown Heavyweight Champion Kento Miyahara, the 2015 Ōdō Tournament winner Jun Akiyama, reigning World Junior Heavyweight and All Asia Tag Team Champion Hikaru Sato and four debuting outsiders; Kendo Kashin, Mitsuya Nagai, Ryoji Sai and Taishi Takizawa. On September 19, Suwama defeated Zeus in the finals to win the tournament.

2017
The 2017 Ōdō Tournament took place between September 12 and 23. Jake Lee was scheduled to take part in the tournament, but was forced to pull out after suffering a knee injury. He was replaced by Kotaro Suzuki.

2018
The 2018 Ōdō Tournament took place between September 15 and 24.

2019
The 2019 Ōdō Tournament took place between September 14 and 23.

2021
The 8th Ōdō Tournament took place between August 15 and 29.

2022
The 9th Ōdō Tournament took place between August 7 and 20.

* Naoya Nomura tested positive for COVID and was replaced by Takao Omori in the semi-finals.

See also
All Japan Pro Wrestling
Champion Carnival
King of DDT Tournament
New Japan Cup
Wrestle-1 Grand Prix

References

External links
The Official All Japan Pro Wrestling website

All Japan Pro Wrestling tournaments